Chester Alamo-Costello (born 1967) is an American artist, educator, publisher and writer based in Chicago, Illinois. He is most known for his long-running, international "Art Drop" series (1998–present), which place art into non-traditional settings, such as public parks, and for his photographic books, whose work has been noted for its rawness and everyday immediacy. He has primarily shown his work in the public domain in countries throughout Europe, the United States and Canada; he has also had exhibits at the Museum of Contemporary Photography and the Hyde Park Art Center. His photography and projects have been reviewed or published in the Chicago Sun-Times, Chicago Tribune Magazine, De Telegraaf (Amsterdam), The Globe and Mail (Canada), New Art Examiner, Museum of Contemporary Art Chicago Magazine, Nerve, and on Chicago Public Radio. Alamo-Costello's books of photography, art and writing include: Somewhere In-Between Chicago (2018), The Globe (2010), and Grandpa Danny (2008). Alamo-Costello is also the publisher of, and a contributor to, The COMP Magazine, a digital art and design journal. He is a professor and former chair of the Department of Art and Design at the University of St. Francis in Joliet, Illinois.

Early life and career 
Alamo-Costello was born Michael Christopher Costello in 1967 in Indianapolis to a blue-collar family that valued practical skills. After developing an interest in art and graduating from Southport High School, he studied graphic design, painting and photography at the Herron School of Art and Design at IUPUI in Indianapolis (BFA, 1990). He moved to Chicago in 1993, and initially photographed artists, musicians, and transients while living in a warehouse district on the city's South Side, near Chinatown. In 1994, he enrolled in graduate school at Columbia College Chicago (MFA, 1998), where he studied with photographers Bob Thall and Melissa Ann Pinney, and painter Corey Postiglione. While continuing to create art, he began his teaching career at Columbia, until he accepted a position at University of St. Francis in 1999. Alamo-Costello lives and works in Chicago with wife, Sandy.

Work 

Although Alamo-Costello's work has included drawings, painting and journals, his artistic practice primarily lies in two areas: art-related public interventions, performances and social experiments that may be site-specific or placed in public space; and photographic series in which he often takes on the role of archivist or journalist, collecting and documenting everyday, contemporary experiences and encounters.

Public and ephemeral art and social experiments 
Alamo-Costello has worked on a range of public, temporary and experimental projects that present artwork in non-traditional settings to "non-art" audiences and explore themes of ephemerality, randomness, communication, and trust. His first forays into this work came about as a founding member of "Armpit" (1992–8), a performance and public art group that included himself and artists Jesse Bercowetz, Nick Nuccio and Michael Plaza. Between 1993–5, they embarked on three "art walks"—the longest, a 298-mile Chicago-to-St. Louis trip—wheeling carts of their own sculpture as a "roving street gallery" bringing contemporary art to communities and viewers that normally have little contact with it in their own environments. In 1994, they created a temporary display of large "urban drop-offs" or "urban totems" in empty Chicago city lots that they made from refuse (cinder blocks, hunks of concrete, scrap wood, tubes and old tires) found on-site. The Chicago Reader'''s Fred Camper described it as a "guerrilla installation" of "near-chaotic accretions" that "gains much from its relationship to the site, and from the social goals that made the group choose it."

 "Art Drop" series 
Alamo-Costello extended the urban drop-off concept with his "art drop" series (1998– ), an art-based social experiment that sought to break through the inaccessibility of art galleries and markets by introducing artworks in unexpected public places, thus involving a broader base of viewers in responding to and collecting art. For the first drop, "Searching for Geomantricks" (1998), Alamo-Costello created sixty  lightboxes with abstract color images inlaid in glass and encased in stained oak frames, which he placed in 20 Chicago public parks for passersby to find, keep and respond to; each was accompanied by a note describing the piece and project, a pen, and a self-addressed, stamped envelope for responding. The images, which resembled spider-like lairs, doubled as "puzzle" pieces that combined to form a large-scale image called Geomantrick's Blessing, which Alamo-Costello created by shooting sections of a string composition with a large format camera, varying exposure times, focus points and color balance.

Between 1999–2004, he produced "Appleseed International"—named for the American folk-hero, Johnny Appleseed—in which he distributed 280 similarly conceived works to 20 U.S. and 20 international city parks.Weiss, Andrea. "Appleseed", Public Art Review, Vol. 12, No. 1, Fall/Winter 2000, p. 52. For New Street Agenda (2005-2013), he created 280 framed graffiti-like prints that comment on contemporary modes of deceptive communication and distributed them in 80 international cities from St. Petersburg, Russia through Europe to the United States. Alamo-Costello has received responses from about 30% of the left pieces, from places as widespread as Edinburgh and Paris to Joliet, Illinois.
	
In 2000, Alamo-Costello produced “The Men Who Sold The World” with Scottish artist Donald McGhie, an interactive exhibition and performance at the Hyde Park Art Center that explored contemporary "savage" capitalism and aggressive marketing techniques in the guise of a "fly-by-night upstart company" willing to buy or sell anything. The show transformed the center into "an enterprise zone" including modern office cubicles, product displays, flashing lights, and money-themed imagery; performative elements—at the opening and a second performance—included aggressive entrepreneurs offering to buy ideas, telemarketing of cellphone users from across the room, a liquidation auction down to the walls, and a money giveaway in the street.

 Documentary photographic practice 
Alamo-Costello has created distinct photographic series since 1993, produced throughout the Midwest and Europe, using an approach informed by art and documentary photographers such as Barbara Crane, Mitch Epstein, Walker Evans, Susan Meiselas, Daidō Moriyama, and August Sander. These series include "Chicago Portraits" (1993- ), depicting Chicago creatives, passersby, and neighborhoods; "7 Minutes SW of the Loop" (1996-2012), portraits and neighborhood studies of Chicago's near south side; "Street Notes" (1993- ), images of ephemeral street art, messages and signage; and "University" (2002- ), images taken at USF. Additional series have formed the basis of his three books.

Alamo-Costello's first sustained photographic subject was his grandfather, Danny Uberto, who he memorialized in his first book, Grandpa Danny (2008). The book combines sections compiling family mementos and snapshots, catalogued personal artifacts, and photos taken by Alamo-Costello; it was described as straddling the genres of fine arts monograph and personal visual tribute documenting a century of everyday life. His second book, The Globe (2010), also took on a personal subject: football (soccer) fan support at The Globe, a pub in Chicago’s Northcenter neighborhood that Alamo-Costello frequented and documented over five years.Guth, Amy, "The Globe," Chicago Tribune, June 5, 2010. The book was noted for its emotional universality, capturing in unpolished, snapshot-like compositions of "unusual rawness and immediacy," the interactions of fans, clubs, and televised contests. Somewhere In-Between Chicago'' (2018) documents people (artists, musicians, commuters, passersby), places, architecture and experiences Alamo-Costello encountered in Chicago over a 25-year period—many compiled through over 170 artist/musician interviews and portraits—along with essays from four writers mirroring the city's diversity and energy.

Publishing and writing 
Alamo-Costello launched The COMP Magazine, a digital publication focusing on art and design, in 2014 with Egzon Shaqiri. He remains the magazine's publisher continues to be an active contributor. He has written articles about artists Kerry James Marshall, Moholy-Nagy, Frida Kahlo and Diego Rivera, the Japanese photography and performance movement “Provoke” and the Hairy Who, Chicago’s underground music scene, comics, and video games. He also works as a historian, documenting Chicago creatives in interviews and portraits. He has interviewed William Conger, Maria Gaspar, Melissa Ann Pinney, Colleen Plumb, Corey Postiglione, Alison Ruttan, and Bob Thall, among many figures.

Teaching 
Alamo-Costello has taught in the Art and Design Department of the University of St. Francis (USF) in Joliet, Illinois since 1999, and served as chair of the department from 2001 to 2009. He directed USF's Moser Performing Arts Center (MPAC) Gallery from 2009 to 2011 and from 1999 to 2004 and brought in several international shows. Alamo-Costello was hired by USF to build up an extremely limited—in scope and faculty—art and design program; he expanded facilities, hired faculty, created course curricula, and increased course offerings and student majors many times over in his time there. Prior to arriving at USF, Alamo-Costello taught photography at Columbia College Chicago (1995–2001); he also lectured at the Museum of Contemporary Photography in Chicago, and was an instructor at John Herron School of Art.

Books
 Alamo-Costello, Chester. (2018). Somewhere In-Between Chicago, Artist Edition, Chicago. Essays by Max King Cap, Juan Angel Chávez, Anya Davidson, and Paul Melvin Hopkin. 
 Alamo & Costello, Chester. (2010). The Globe, Chicago: Dark Lark Press. 
 Alamo & Costello, Chester. (2008). Grandpa Danny, Chicago: Dark Lark Press.

References

External links 
Alamo-Costello Archive – official website
The COMP Art and Design Magazine

20th-century American painters
20th-century American photographers
1967 births
Living people
21st-century American painters
21st-century American photographers